"Love On Your Side" is a song by British pop band Thompson Twins, released as the second single from the band's third studio album, Quick Step & Side Kick (1983), which was renamed Side Kicks in the US.

Background and recording
In 1982, after the commercial failure of their second studio album Set, the Thompson Twins collaborated with producer Alex Sadkin to record Quick Step & Side Kick. Sadkin produced the album including "Love On Your Side".

The original lyrics were written by Alannah Currie, but were later altered to that of a male perspective, as Currie wasn't the lead singer. Tom Bailey has said of the song: "it's actually a complicated and quite dark song. It's about discovering that your girlfriend or boyfriend wants to experiment with a relationship in a much deeper or broader sense than you were prepared to do. And so it drags you into this kind of helpless feeling of being lost, helplessly in love, but taking some kind of confidence from the fact that love will help you through those difficult situations. So it's a naïve and complicated song."

Release
"Love On Your Side" was released in January 1983 as a 7" and 12" single and as a 7" and 12" double pack including the free single "In the Name of Love". The 12" version featured extended mixes of the song. 

It was the band's first top ten hit, reaching no. 9 in the UK, as well as no. 45 in the US. It was also a top ten hit in New Zealand and Norway, a top twenty hit in Belgium and spent 14 weeks on the German singles chart.

In popular culture
The song is featured in the soundtrack of the video game Grand Theft Auto: Vice City Stories on the in-game radio station "Wave 103".

Track listing
 12" Single (ARIST 12504, ARIST 12 504)
"Love On Your Side (Rap Boy Rap)" – 7:22
"Love On Your Side (No Talkin')" – 5:48

 7" Single (ARIST 504)
"Love On Your Side" – 3:34
"Love On Your Back" – 4:06

Official versions
 UK Album Version – 4:25
 US Album Version – 3:33
 Extended Version – 7:22

Sales chart performance

Weekly charts

See also
1983 in British music
Thompson Twins discography

References

External links
 

1983 singles
Thompson Twins songs
Songs written by Tom Bailey (musician)
Songs written by Alannah Currie
1983 songs
Songs written by Joe Leeway
Arista Records singles